Uta's Songs: One Piece Film Red is a soundtrack album by Japanese singer Ado, released on August 10, 2022, by Virgin Music. The album accompanies the 2022 Japanese animated film, One Piece Film: Red. The album was preceded by three singles: "New Genesis", "I'm Invincible" and "Backlight", all of which charted within the top 5 of the Billboard Japan Hot 100 and the top 80 of the Billboard Global 200.

Upon its release, Uta's Songs: One Piece Film Red debuted and peaked at number 1 on the Oricon Combined Albums Chart and on the Billboard Japan Hot Albums chart and number 2 on the Oricon Albums Chart. Following the global success of the album, Ado signed a record deal with Geffen Records.

Background 
Ado previously released her debut studio album, Kyōgen, in January 2022. The album broke previously set records in Japan, most notably becoming the first debut studio album by a solo female artist to debut at number one since Miwa's 2011 album, Guitarissimo. 

On June 8, the cast for the upcoming film, One Piece Film: Red was revealed. Amongst the cast, Ado was revealed as the singing voice actress for the character Uta while Kaori Nazuka reprised her role for Uta's non-singing parts. A single titled "New Genesis" was announced for release later that month, produced by Mrs. Green Apple, Vaundy, Fake Type, Hiroyuki Sawano and Yuta Orisaka were amongst those announced providing songs for the soundtrack album. On June 15, the album art was revealed, drawn by Eiichiro Oda. "New Genesis" topped Apple Music's Top 100: Global playlist, a first for a Japanese song. Shortly after the release of "New Genesis", a second single titled "I'm Invincible" was announced alongside its music video, which was released on June 22. The third and final single "Backlight" was released on July 6, 2022. "Fleeting Lullaby" later was released as a promotional single, days before the release of the album.

Release 
Uta's Songs: One Piece Red was released on August 10, 2022. Alongside the standard version of the album, a limited DVD and first press version was released in Japan on the same day, the latter containing two bonus remixes and three music videos. Shortly after Ado signed with Geffen Records, Decca Records began to sell copies of the standard version of Uta's Songs: One Piece Film Red in the United Kingdom. Geffen later announced they would physically release the album globally on December 16.

Critical reception 

Uta's Songs: One Piece Film Red was met with positive reviews from critics. Just Lunning of IGN praised Ado's versatility, stating the album "allow[ed] Ado to show off her fantastic tonal range." Gizmodo commented that "nearly all of [the songs] will be an earworm for some time, and some of the final songs may end up being tearjerkers for viewers."

Commercial performance

Japan 
Uta's Songs: One Piece Film Red debuted and peaked at number one on the Billboard Japan Hot Albums chart and the Oricon Combined Albums chart. In physical sales, the album debuted and peaked at number two on the Oricon Albums Chart. For the month of August, the album debuted and peaked at number two on the monthly Oricon Albums chart. Within one month, Uta's Songs: One Piece Film Red received a Platinum certification from the Recording Industry Association of Japan.

The album broke multiple records on the Billboard Japan and Oricon charts. For the first time in Billboard Japan history, Ado became the first artist to have three songs simultaneously on the top 3 of the Japan Hot 100.  Ado later broke her own record, having five songs from the album chart in the top 5 of Japan Hot 100. On the Oricon charts, Ado became the first artist in Oricon history to have five songs chart in the top 5 of the Streaming chart.

Americas 
Following the release of the film in North America in November 2022, Uta's Songs: One Piece Film Red debuted at number 9 on the Billboard Heatseekers Albums chart and number 7 on the World Albums chart. Spotify reported that streams of the One Piece Film: Red playlist rose 32.7 times in the United States.

Europe 
In Belgium, Uta's Songs: One Piece Film Red debuted and peaked at number 168 on the Ultratop Wallonia charts. In France, the album debuted and peaked at number 97. In Spain, Uta's Songs: One Piece Film Red debuted and peaked at number 95.

Track listing

Personnel 
Credits adapted from Tidal.

Musicians 

 Ado – vocals
 Keisuke Oyama – background vocals
 Kenta Isohi – background vocals
 Mayumi Watanabe – background vocals
 Mika Akiba – background vocals
 Sak – background vocals
 Shiori Sasaki – background vocals
 Yasutaka Nakata – songwriting, production
 Motoki Ohmori – songwriting, production
 Shuhei Ito – cello
 Sonoko Muraoka – cello
 Hideyuki Kurakazu – drums, triangle, tambourine
 Natsuhiko Mori – electric bass
 Ken Ito – horn arrangement
 Ryoka Fujisawa – piano
 Ken Ito – string arrangement
 Nobuhide Handa – trombone
 Tatsuhiko Yoshizawa – trombone
 Mei Mishina – viola
 Sumire Segawa – viola
 Anzu Suhara – violin
 Daisuke Yamamoto – violin
 Honoka Sato – violin
 Kon Shirasu – violin
 Sena Oshima – violin
 Shino Miwa –violin
 Tsukasa Nagura – violin
 Yuki Nakajima – violin
 Johngarabushi – guitar
 Toshino Tanabe – bass
 Makoto Fujisaki – drums
 Hiroshi Iimuro – guitar
 Hiroyuki Sawano – production, songwriting, keyboard, piano
 Daisuke Kawaguichi – piano
 Erika Aoyama – strings
 Hiroomi Shitara – acoustic guitar
 Yu Suto – bass
 Noriyasu "Kaasuke" Kawamura – drums
 Hideyo Takakuwa – flute
 Tomoyuki Asakawa – harp
 Otohiko Fujita – horn
 Tomoyo Shoji – horn
 Satoshi Shoji – oboe
 Ryoichi Kayatani – percussion
 Tomi Yo – piano
 Hideyo Takakuwa – piccolo
 Koichiro Muroya – strings
 Toshiyuki Muranaka – cello
 Nishi-ken – production, piano
 Daisuke Kadowaki – string arrangement, violin
 Sena Oshima – viola
 Daisuke Yamato – violin
 Yasutaka Nakata – production, songwriting
 Vaundy – production, songwriting
 Uechang – bass
 Bobo – drums
 Taking – guitar
 Fake Type – production, songwriting
 Tophamhat-kyo – songwriting
 Canon – songwriting
 Yuta Orisaka – production, songwriting
 Motohiro Hata – production, songwriting
 Kohei Tanaka – songwriting
 Eiichiro Oda – songwriting
 Junya Kondo – alto saxophone

Technical 

 Yasutaka Nakata – recording arrangement
 Ken Ito – recording arrangement
 Mrs. Green Apple – recording arrangement
 Vaundy – recording arrangement
 Dyes Iwasaki – recording arrangement
 Hiroyuki Sawano – recording arrangement
 Daisukue Kawaguchi – programming, recording arrangement
 Motohiro Hata – recording arrangement
 Tomi Yo – recording arrangement
 Nishi-ken – recording arrangement

Charts

Weekly charts

Monthly charts

Year-end charts

Certifications

Release history

Notes

References

External links 

 
 
 

2022 soundtrack albums
Ado (singer) albums
Virgin Records soundtracks
Universal Music Japan albums
Universal Music Group soundtracks
Albums produced by Yasutaka Nakata